Dante Pazzanese (December 31, 1900 – January 9, 1975) was a noted Italian-Brazilian physician and cardiovascular surgeon of São Paulo, the founder of the Institute of Cardiology of the State of São Paulo, which now bears his name.

Pazzanese was born in Barão de Monte Alto, Minas Gerais, Brazil. In addition to his work as a surgeon, he was the founder, on August 14, 1943, of the Brazilian Society of Cardiology, which is now the largest cardiology society in Latin America and the 3rd in the world. He died in São Paulo, aged 74.

References

Brazilian cardiac surgeons
Brazilian people of Italian descent
1900 births
1975 deaths
20th-century Brazilian physicians
20th-century surgeons